"Buffalo Stance" is a song by Swedish singer-songwriter Neneh Cherry, released in November 1988 as the first single from her debut album, Raw Like Sushi (1989). The song peaked at  3 on both the UK Singles Chart and the US Billboard Hot 100, and it reached No. 1 in Cherry's native Sweden and the Netherlands. An early version of the song appeared as the B-side on the 1986 Stock, Aitken, and Waterman-produced single "Looking Good Diving" by duo Morgan-McVey, which was made up of Jamie Morgan and Cherry's future husband Cameron McVey. The song, titled "Looking Good Diving with the Wild Bunch", was sung by Cherry.

Morgan says the B-side was written using elements from the single's A-side, most notably Phil Ramacon's distinctive ascending keyboard hook, with Cherry writing the rap, while he supplied lyrics for the sung chorus. He says that no one working on the track recognised its hit potential, which was only reconsidered after his chance encounter at The Wag nightclub with DJ Tim Simenon, who expressed interest in reworking the song. 

The song title refers to "Buffalo", a group of photographers, models, musicians, hair and makeup artists, etc. formed by fashion stylist Ray Petri, of which group Cherry, Morgan, and McVey were all members. A buffalo stance is, Cherry told The New York Times, "an attitude you have to have in order to get by. It's not about fashion but about survival in inner cities and elsewhere." The song's title is also a reference to the Malcolm McLaren song "Buffalo Gals" (1982), which "Buffalo Stance" samples. Other samples came from Rock Steady Crew's "Hey You", and the saxophone break is from the band Miami's song "Chicken Yellow" (1974).

Cherry performed the song live on Top of the Pops while seven-months pregnant. When asked by a reporter if it were safe for her to go up on stage performing, Cherry answered: "Yes, of course! It's not an illness."

Chart performance
"Buffalo Stance" was very successful, becoming a worldwide hit for Cherry. In Europe, the song peaked at number one in the singer's native Sweden as well as in the Netherlands. It entered the top 10 also in Austria (7), Belgium (4), Denmark (9), Finland (5), West Germany (2), Greece (2), Ireland (7), Norway (3), Switzerland (2) and the UK. In the latter, "Buffalo Stance" peaked at number three in its sixth week on the UK Singles Chart on January 8, 1989. It spent two weeks at that position before dropping to number eight and then leaving the UK Top 10 the following week. On the Eurochart Hot 100, the single reached number three in February 1989. Outside Europe, "Buffalo Stance" charted on five different Billboard charts in the US; number three on the Hot 100, number one on both the Hot Dance Club Play chart and the Dance Singles Sales chart, number 16 on the Hot Rap Songs chart and number 30 on the Hot R&B/Hip-Hop Songs chart. In Canada, the single reached number one on the RPM Dance/Urban chart, while reaching number three on the RPM Top Singles chart. In Australia and New Zealand, "Buffalo Stance" charted at number 21 and 14, respectively.

The single earned Cherry a gold record in Canada (50,000), Sweden (25,000) and the United States (500,000), and a silver record in the UK (250,000).

Critical reception
Robert Hilburn from Los Angeles Times complimented "Buffalo Stance" as "a sly and sassy, yet also disarmingly tender slice of street-wise admonition to stand up for your rights rather than let insecurities or peer pressure lead you to mistakes in judgment." Another editor, Chris Willman, commented, "No money-man can win my love / It's sweetness that I'm dreaming of, sings Cherry, turning down a "gigolo" who may or may not be a garden-variety pimp. Nothing new there, but the pleasure of this tale is in the telling, and Britain's ripe-and-ready Cherry is an irresistible storyteller, rapping the verses with cocky defiance and singing the choruses with equally unruly loveliness." 

Mark Lepage from Montreal Gazette stated, "The lovely Neneh has the best song on radio now, with the possible exception of Womack and Womack's "Teardrops". "Buffalo Stance" is a sexy, saucy and feisty rap/dance summer hit, the kind of thing for which car radios were created." People Magazine remarked that the singer half-sings, half-raps, "mock-tough lyrics" over a prominent drum-machine beat and minimal synthesized accompaniment. The reviewer added that "when she sticks to that formula, singing about infatuation and seduction on the city's mean sidewalks" as on "Buffalo Stance", "she's fresh and inviting." Miranda Sawyer from Smash Hits felt it's "the best dance record in yonks. A brilliant melody plus a rap which knocks the "spots" off Salt 'n' Pepa makes this utterly ace and runner-up Single of the Fortnight."

Retrospective response
Andy Kellman from AllMusic described the song as "at once a personal manifesto and celebration and critique of city-street peacocking". Annie Zaleski from The A.V. Club called it an "unstoppable, electro-hip-hop hybrid". She stated, "With smart samples and swaggering production from Bomb the Bass—not to mention fiercely feminist lyrics that demand respect and assert independence—“Buffalo Stance” remains one of the best singles of the ’80s." Angus Taylor for BBC noted "its undulating synths, You go girl! sentiments and killer hooks is every bit the floor-filler it was ten years ago." Kieran Yates from The Guardian called it a "punchy manifesto". Stephen Holden from The New York Times felt "the musically multilayered dance hit "Buffalo Stance" defines a late-80's street attitude." In an 2014 retrospective reviewe, Pop Rescue commented that "it’s (OMG!) got a female rapper, record scratching, and a fast beat, and this was a fresh sound. Only Salt-N-Pepa could have got close." 

Lesley Chow from The Quietus said that on the song, "Cherry already comes across as a fully formed artist: powerful and casually multicultural, as we might expect from an African-Swedish singer raised in Yorkshire and Long Island." She added that it is "a song of many moods, as Cherry goes on to alternate between anger and softness, anti-materialism and a high fashion attitude. A rising synth figure bubbles us up to a heavenly chorus ("No money man can win my love/ It's sweetness that I'm thinking of") which shows a rare tenderness in the narrator. Even though the track has been unrelenting up to now, the bubbling and the melody expose an underlying effervescence."

Impact and legacy
Q Magazine ranked "Buffalo Stance" No. 606 in their list of the "1001 Best Songs Ever" in 2003. The Daily Telegraph ranked it No. 37 in their "Top 50 Dance Songs" list in 2015. The Guardian ranked it No. 8 in their list of "The greatest ever female rap tracks – ranked!" in 2018, while Time Out ranked the song No. 13 in their "The 50 best '80s songs" list same year. Rolling Stone ranked "Buffalo Stance" No. 412 in their list of "500 Best Songs of All Time" in 2021 and No. 71 in their "200 Greatest Dance Songs of All Time" in 2022.

Track listings

 7-inch and US cassette single
A. "Buffalo Stance"
B. "Buffalo Stance" (Electro Ski mix)

 Non-US 12-inch single
A1. "Buffalo Stance"
A2. "Buffalo Stance" (Scratchapella)
B1. "Buffalo Stance" (instrumental)
B2. "Buffalo Stance" (Electro Ski mix)

 European CD single and UK mini-CD single
 "Buffalo Stance" (extended/12-inch mix) – 5:43
 "Buffalo Stance" (Scratchapella) – 1:38
 "Buffalo Stance" (Electro Ski) – 3:38
 "Give Me a Muthuf***ing Breakbeat" (Sukka mix)

 US and Canadian 12-inch single
A1. "Buffalo Stance" (12-inch A mix) – 5:47
A2. "Buffalo Stance" (Sukka mix) – 5:20
B1. "Buffalo Stance" (1/2 Way 2 House mix) – 7:40
B2. "Buffalo Stance" (Techno Stance remix I) – 6:40
B3. "Buffalo Stance" (Scratchapella) – 1:39

 Australian cassette single
 "Buffalo Stance"
 "Buffalo Stance" (instrumental)
 "Buffalo Stance" (Electro Ski mix)

 Japanese mini-CD single
 "Buffalo Stance"
 "Manchild"

Charts

Weekly charts

Year-end charts

Certifications

References

External links
 Official Music Video - YouTube

1988 debut singles
1988 songs
Dutch Top 40 number-one singles
Neneh Cherry songs
Number-one singles in Sweden
Song recordings produced by Bomb the Bass
Song recordings produced by Mark Saunders
Songs written by Cameron McVey
Songs written by Neneh Cherry
Virgin Records singles